Hal Willis is the name of:

Hal Willis (ice hockey) (born 1946), Canadian ice hockey defenceman
Hal Willis (singer) (1933–2015), Canadian country singer
Hal Willis, fictional police detective of the 87th Precinct series written by Ed McBain
Charles Robert Forrester (1803–1850), English writer who sometimes wrote under the pseudonym Hal Willis

See also
Chuck Willis (Harold Willis, 1928–1958), American rhythm and blues singer